In metallurgy, melchior is an alloy of copper, mainly with nickel (5–30%). The term melchior sometimes refers not only to the copper-nickel alloys, but also ternary alloys of copper with nickel and zinc ("nickel silver") and even a silvered brass. Melchior is easily deformable by application of pressure, both in the hot and cold state. After annealing, it has a tensile strength of about 40 kg/mm2. The most valuable property of melchior is its high resistance to corrosion in air, freshwater and seawater. Increasing content of nickel, iron or manganese improves corrosion and cavitation resistance, especially in sea water and atmospheric water vapor. The alloy of 30% Ni, 0.8% Fe, 1% Mn and 68.2% Cu is used in maritime shipping, in particular for the manufacture of condenser tubes. Nickel gives melchior, unlike brass and bronze, a silver color, and that property, combined with its high corrosion resistance, made it popular for the manufacture of household utensils in the Soviet Union, though more recent research has concluded that nickel is mildly carcinogenic when used in food preparation and consumption.

See also
Cupronickel
Monel

References

Copper alloys
Nickel alloys
Coinage metals and alloys

fr:Maillechort